Air Leasing Cameroon is an air charter company based in Douala, Cameroon.

Destinations
 - Cameroon
Douala - Douala International Airport
Garoua - Garoua International Airport
Maroua - Salak Airport
Yaoundé - Yaoundé Nsimalen International Airport 
 - Chad
N'Djamena - N'Djamena International Airport
 - Equatorial Guinea
Malabo - Malabo International Airport

Fleet
, the Air Leasing Cameroon fleet consists of the following aircraft:

The airline had previously operated a further two Fokker F28 aircraft.

References

External links
 

Airlines of Cameroon
Companies based in Douala